Tigner is a surname. Notable people with the surname include:

Eddie Tigner (1926–2019), American blues pianist, keyboardist, singer, and songwriter
Germanicus Young Tigner (1856–1938), American judge and politician
Marcy Tigner (1921–2012), American Christian children's entertainer
Maury Tigner (born 1937), American physicist